Elis Esaias Sipilä (27 October 1887 – 13 December 1958) was a Finnish gymnast who won bronze in the 1908 Summer Olympics.

Gymnastics 

He won the Finnish national championship in team gymnastics as a member of Ylioppilasvoimistelijat in 1909.

Homicide 

He shot a man apparently to cover up a fraud in Vaasa on 2 March 1934. He was convicted to 12 years in prison for manslaughter and embezzlement.

Sources

References 

1887 births
1958 deaths
Finnish male artistic gymnasts
Gymnasts at the 1908 Summer Olympics
Olympic gymnasts of Finland
Olympic bronze medalists for Finland
Olympic medalists in gymnastics

Medalists at the 1908 Summer Olympics
20th-century Finnish people